Psychotria adamsonii is a species of plant in the family Rubiaceae. It is endemic to French Polynesia. The epithet adamsonii commemorates Alastair Martin Adamson of the Pacific Entomological Survey.

References 

Flora of French Polynesia
adamsonii
Data deficient plants
Taxonomy articles created by Polbot